The Grand Embassy was a Russian diplomatic mission to Western Europe from 9 March 1697 to 25 August 1698 led by Peter the Great.

Description
In 1697 and 1698, Peter the Great embarked on his Grand Embassy. The primary goal of the mission was to strengthen and broaden the Holy League, Russia's alliance with a number of European countries against the Ottoman Empire in the Russian struggle for the northern coastline of the Black Sea. The tsar also sought to hire foreign specialists for Russian service and to acquire military weapons.

Officially, the Grand Embassy was headed by the "grand ambassadors" Franz Lefort, Fedor Golovin and Prokopy Voznitsyn. In fact, it was led by Peter himself, who went along incognito under the name of Peter Mikhailov. At  Peter was one of the tallest men in Europe, a fact very hard to disguise.

Peter conducted negotiations with Friedrich Casimir Kettler, the Duke of Courland, and concluded an alliance with King Frederick I of Prussia. He arrived in the Dutch Republic at the start of August 1697, where he worked incognito as a shipbuilder.

On 11 September 1697 Peter met with William III, who governed both the Netherlands and England, and the States-General in October of that year. William was in Utrecht at the time. On invitation from William, Peter visited England in 1698. He stayed there for 105 days. While in Britain, he had an affair with Letitia Cross.

At Utrecht, the encounter between the two rulers was recognized as a significant event (a medal to commemorate the occasion was created). In his desire for an alliance, Peter was prepared to support William in the Nine Years' War against France even though the final treaty would be signed nine days later.

Peter failed to expand the anti-Ottoman alliance. The Grand Embassy had to limit itself to acquiring different equipment and hiring foreign specialists especially in military and naval affairs.

Visit to England

Peter and part of the Embassy arrived in England on 11 January 1698, and left on 21 April. His entourage included four chamberlains, three interpreters, two clocksmiths, a cook, a priest, six trumpeters, 70 soldiers as tall as their monarch, four dwarves, and a monkey. The party landed at the Watergate to York House, built in 1672 by George Villiers, 2nd Duke of Buckingham.

Peter met with King William and his court frequently on informal bases, keeping to his preferred method of traveling through Europe. By February, the English king inquired "en plaine cour" on the date of Peter's departure after tactics of cutting the Russians daily allowances and denying their requests for horse and a carriage didn't work. The Russian czar eventually picked a date in end of April.

At the behest of the king, Peregrine Osborne, Marquess of Carmarthen (later Duke of Leeds) designed a yacht for him, which was named the Royal Transport. Carmarthen also became a drinking companion to the tsar. Peter was delighted that the Englishman could keep up with his consumption of alcohol. A legend was created of their drinking: the pub the two men frequented changed its name to Czar of Muscovy (the establishment no longer in existence but a street in London, Muscovy Street, today bears its name from that heritage)

Peter visited the Royal Observatory, the Royal Mint, the Royal Society, the University of Oxford, as well as several shipyards and artillery plants. He studied the English techniques of city-building. He would later use that knowledge to great effect at Saint Petersburg. In Deptford's royal dockyards, he acquired skills that later helped him raise a Russian fleet; he studied in the Royal Observatory to improve Russian navigational skills; in Woolwich Arsenal he learned how to produce artillery. Although Peter had numerous opportunities to spend time with Isaac Newton, Christopher Wren, and Edmund Halley, he did not meet with them.

Instead, he concentrated on his goal of acquiring valuable technology that "had ultimately proved frustrating" in the Netherlands. The Dutch had one of the most sophisticated shipyard operations in Europe but most of their work method were not written down. Instead, in Peter's own words, they used "measure of intuition and unwritten custom that was difficult to codify". The decision to visit Britain was easily made when Peter heard that the British shipyard employed "art and science" practices that could be learned in a short time.

Peter did meet with other notable intellectuals.

Although at first denying audience to them, Peter eventually took interest in the Quakers. The elders of the faith took note of that by sending five of their statesmen including Thomas Story and William Penn to meet with him. The Quakers presented Peter with Barclay’s Apology and other Quaker works. Peter challenged the Quaker delegation on the usefulness of their faith to a state as the adherents to the religion would not join the armed forces. The delegation pointed out that their faith values were hard work, honesty, and innovation. The Russian monarch was suitably impressed by the meeting and attended, unannounced, the Gracechurch St Meeting the following Sunday. Unlike the conversations with others through the use of an interpreter, Penn and Peter interacted in German, the language the two men knew well and the house on Norfolk Street where Peter stayed had a "few years before been the refuge of William Penn." At the time, Penn was the largest non-royal landowner in the world. The men met twice and afterwards Penn wrote a letter reminding absolute ruler of Russia that, "If thou wouldst rule well, thou must rule for God; and to do that thou must be ruled by Him who has given kings his grace to command themselves and their subject, and to the people the grace to obey God and their kings".

The trip was not one-sided in favour of Russia, however, as England likewise benefited from Peter's visit. Peter's father, Tsar Alexis, had severed diplomatic and commercial ties with England following the execution of King Charles I in 1649. The trade between the two countries declined precipitously and the Muscovy Company's monopoly on Anglo-Russian trade deteriorated in value. By the time of Peter's reign, many English merchants wished to gain access to the Russian markets thanks to the large quantities of various goods they could sell to the Russians. Additionally, English shipbuilders sought the importation of Russian raw materials (primarily oak) for the Royal Navy. The English were partially successful negotiating with Peter to establish stronger commercial ties. Noted academic Arthur MacGregor wrote as such concerning the impact of the trip:
For two decades following Peter's visit, British influence in Russia reached a peak. It manifested itself in social custom, in craft practice and in ships and naval organization. Through the influence of the Moscow School of Mathematics and Navigation it reached a significant sector of the population before relations cooled once again and the two nations pulled back from this era of unprecedented cordiality.

At first, Peter stayed at 21 Norfolk Street in London. On 9 February the tsar and his court moved into Sayes Court, which was adjacent to the Deptford Dockyard. They subleased the house from John Benbow, who was at the time renting the house from John Evelyn. John Evelyn did not meet with Peter. The Russian party did great harm to both house and grounds. Sir Christopher Wren, the royal surveyor, added up the bill. It totaled £305 9s 6d and included £3 for "wheelbarrows broke by the Czar". The damage was so extensive that:
No part of the house escaped damage. All the floors were covered with grease and ink, and three new floors had to be provided. The tiled stoves, locks to the doors, and all the paintwork had to be renewed. The curtains, quilts, and bed linen were 'tore in pieces.' All the chairs in the house, numbering over fifty, were broken, or had disappeared, probably used to stoke the fires. Three hundred window panes were broken and there were 'twenty fine pictures very much tore and all frames broke.' The garden which was Evelyn’s pride was ruined.

On his departure, Peter gave his mistress, Letitia Cross, £500 to thank her for her hospitality. Cross said it was not enough while Peter replied that he thought her overpaid.

On 21 April 1698 Peter left England for Holland. His yacht, the Royal Transport, accompanied him on part of the journey as it was set to sail to Russia without him. Although reports differ, Peter was able to garner between 60 and as high as 500 of British subjects that entered into the service of the Russian state. Many of the most notable were on the yacht that took them to Arkhangelsk.

Return to Russia
On the way back to Russia, the Grand Embassy conducted fruitless negotiations in Vienna with Russia's former allies in the Holy League, the Austrian foreign minister and the Venetian ambassador, trying to prevent Austria's separate peace treaty with Turkey. An intended visit to Venice was canceled due to the news about the Streltsy Uprising in Moscow and Peter's hasty return to Russia.

The Grand Embassy failed to accomplish its main goal, but it gathered valuable information about the international situation, ascertained the impossibility of strengthening the anti-Turkish coalition due to the imminent War of the Spanish Succession, and brought back the plans for gaining access to the Baltic Sea. On his way back to Russia, Peter the Great met with Augustus II of Poland-Lithuania and conducted negotiations with him, which would form the basis for the Russo-Polish alliance against Sweden in the Great Northern War.

See also 
 Czar Peter House

References

Further reading

 
 
 Hughes, Lindsey, ed.. Peter the Great and the West: New Perspectives Palgrave MacMillan, 2001.
 
 
 Massie, Robert K. Peter the Great: his life and world (2012). a popular biography based on limited sources.
 
 

Peter the Great
Politics of the Russian Empire
1697 in Europe
1698 in Europe
Voyages
Defunct diplomatic missions of Russia
Foreign relations of the Dutch Republic